Skihist Mountain, also sometimes referred to as Skihist Peak, is the highest mountain in the Cantilever Range and in southwestern British Columbia, Canada. It is the highest summit in the Lillooet Ranges, which lie between the Lillooet and Fraser Rivers, south of the Gates Valley and Seton and Anderson Lakes.

Skihist Mountain consists of a north–south aligned ridge. Kent Creek drains its northern slopes while Nesbitt Creek drains the south and west slopes.  Both creeks feed the Stein River. On its eastern slopes, it is drained by North Kwoiek Creek, which originates at Skihist Lake, a small mountain lake located approximately three kilometres southeast of Skihist's summit.

The peak is most easily climbed via its south slopes, from the North Kwoiek Creek drainage.

Name origin
According to ethnologist James Teit, writing in 1917, the word skihist means "jump" or "leap", referring to a giant in mythological times who leapt back and forth between this summit and Akasik Mountain.  Helen and GPW Akrigg, in their British Columbia Place Name book, say it is from Sk-haest, meaning "peak between two ridges".

Skihist Provincial Park is not near the mountain, but on the other side of the Fraser and up the Thompson River some distance, but is so named because it has a good view of this summit.

See also
 Geography of British Columbia
 Petlushkwohap Mountain

References

External links
 "Skihist Mountain, British Columbia" on Peakbagger

Two-thousanders of British Columbia
Lillooet Ranges
Fraser Canyon
Kamloops Division Yale Land District